Walter Wick (born February 23, 1953) is an American artist and photographer best known for the elaborate images in two series of picture book activities for young children, I Spy (1992 to 1999) and Can You See What I See? (2002 to 2013), both published by Scholastic.

Early life 
Wick was born in Hartford, Connecticut and grew up in rural East Granby, Connecticut. His brother introduced him to photography.

Wick studied photojournalism at the Paier College of Art.

Career 
After graduation, he opened a studio in New York.

He embarked on a career as a commercial photographer and eventually shifted to photo-illustration for books and magazines. He contributed to Scholastic's Let's Find Out and Super Science series and photographed hundreds of mass-market magazine covers. He also created photographic puzzles for Games magazine.

In 1991, Wick began a collaboration with writer Jean Marzollo on the enormously successful I Spy search-and-find picture books. Eight original titles were produced and millions of copies sold. Wick received the Boston Globe-Horn Book first prize for non-fiction for his book A Drop of Water: A Book of Science and Wonder. His book Walter Wick's Optical Tricks was named one of the year's "best illustrated books" by The New York Times.

In 2003, Wick and his wife purchased an abandoned 1920 firehouse from the city of Hartford and renovated the building into an art studio.

Wick's collection of work, Walter Wick: Games, Gizmos, and Toys in the Attic, continues to exhibit in museums across the country including the Vero Beach Museum of Art, the Shelburne Museum, and Brigham Young University Museum of Art.

Personal life 
Wick is married to Linda Cheverton Wick, a former photo prop stylist for magazines and cookbooks.

Selected publications

I Spy: A Book of Picture Riddles (1992)
I Spy: Christmas (1992)
I Spy: Fun House (1993)
I Spy: Mystery (1993)
I Spy: Fantasy (1994)
I Spy: School Days (1995)
I Spy: Spooky Night (1996)
A Drop of Water: A Book of Science & Wonder (1997) 
I Spy: Super Challenger! (1997)
Walter Wick's Optical Tricks (1998)
I Spy: Gold Challenger! (1998)
I Spy: Treasure Hunt (1999)
I Spy: Extreme Challenger!'" (2000)I Spy: Year-Round Challenger! (2001)Can You See What I See?: Picture Puzzles to Search and Solve (2002)I Spy: Ultimate Challenger! (2003)Can You See What I See?: Dream Machine (2003)Seymour and the Juice Box Boat (2004)Can You See What I See?: Cool Collections (2004)Can You See What I See?: The Night Before Christmas (2005)Seymour makes New Friends (2006)Can You See What I See?: Once Upon A Time (2006)Can You See What I See?: On the Road (2008)Can You See What I See?: On A Scary Scary Night (2008)I Spy: A To Z (2009)Can You See What I See?: Treasure Ship (2010)I Spy: Spectacular (2011)Can You See What I See?: Toyland Express (2011)I Spy: Sticker Book and Picture Riddles (2012)Can You See What I See?: Out Of This World (2013)Walter Wick: Games, Gizmos, and Toys in the Attic (2014)Can You See What I See?: Christmas (Board Book) (2015)Hey, Seymour! (2015)Can You See What I See? Big Book of Search-And-Find Fun (2016)A Ray of Light (2019) Can You See What I See?: Hidden Wonders (2021)

Sources
"About the author" information, I Spy Fun House: A Book of Picture Riddles by Walter Wick and Jean Marzollo, New York, Scholastic, 1993, p. 37.
"Artist's Statement" Walter Wick: Games, Gizmos, and Toys in the Attic'' by Walter Wick, Brigham Young University, 2009.

References

External links

 
Interview by Children's Literature
 

1953 births
Living people
American photographers
American children's writers